Otterbein Elementary School is one of 3 public elementary schools in Benton County, Indiana and is located in Otterbein, Indiana. The school mascot is the Red Devil. In 1972 half of the elementary, previously a high school, caught fire and burned down. Otterbein's first class was the class of 1910 and in 2010 Otterbein celebrated 100 years of being open.

Activities

Otterbein offers a few choices in sports and activities. Boys sports include Basketball and Baseball. Girls sports include Basketball, Softball, & Volleyball. There is also an after school program for students. 6th Grade students are invited to be part of the Otterbein beginning band.

Notable alumni
Neal Musser - Former Major League Baseball Player for the New York Mets, Arizona Diamondbacks, Kansas City Royals and Houston Astros
Dick Atha - Former NBA Player for the New York Knicks and Detroit Pistons (Otterbein High School Graduate)

External Links 

 Official Website 

Elementary schools in Indiana
Schools in Benton County, Indiana
1910 establishments in Indiana